Gregory Paul Meredith (born February 23, 1958) is a Canadian former professional ice hockey player.

Biography
As a youth, Meredith played in the 1971 Quebec International Pee-Wee Hockey Tournament with a minor ice hockey team from Toronto.

A finalist for the Rhodes Scholarship, Meredith attended Notre Dame, where he set the Notre Dame all-time goals record, with 104. 

Meredith was a sixth round selection, 97th overall by the Atlanta Flames in the 1978 NHL Entry Draft. He then played 43 games in the National Hockey League for the Calgary Flames in 1980–81 and 1982–83, recording six goals and four assists in the regular season, and three goals and one assist in five playoff games. He retired following the 1983–84 season.

After a knee injury ended his hockey career, Meredith attended business school at Harvard University, where he was a volunteer assistant ice hockey coach. Meredith won the NCAA Silver Anniversary Award in 2005 for prominence as a student athlete and success in business. He was the tenth Notre Dame graduate to win the award. In 2004, Meredith worked as the managing director for Putnam Lovell NBF Securities Inc.

Awards and honours

References

External links

1958 births
Living people
AHCA Division I men's ice hockey All-Americans
Atlanta Flames draft picks
Birmingham Bulls (CHL) players
Calgary Flames players
Canadian ice hockey forwards
Colorado Flames players
Harvard Business School alumni
Notre Dame Fighting Irish men's ice hockey players
Oklahoma City Stars players
Ice hockey people from Toronto
Toronto Marlboros players
Tulsa Oilers (1964–1984) players
Canadian expatriate ice hockey players in the United States